KTM AG (Kronreif & Trunkenpolz Mattighofen) formerly KTM Sportmotorcycle AG) is an Austrian  motorcycle, bicycle and sports car manufacturer owned by Pierer Mobility AG and the Indian manufacturer Bajaj Auto. It was formed in 1992 but traces its foundation to as early as 1934. Today, KTM AG is the parent company of the KTM Group, consisting of a number of motorcycle brands.

KTM is known for its off-road motorcycles (enduro, motocross and supermoto). Since the late 1990s, it has expanded into street motorcycle production and developing sports cars – namely the X-Bow. In 2015, KTM sold almost as many street as off-road bikes.

From 2012, KTM was the largest motorcycle manufacturer in Europe for four consecutive years. Globally, the company is among the leading off-road motorcycle manufacturers. In 2016, KTM sold 203,423 motor vehicles worldwide.

History

Early years 
In 1934, an Austrian engineer Johann (Hans) Trunkenpolz (1909–1962) set up a fitter's and car repair shop in Mattighofen. In 1937, he started selling DKW motorcycles, and Opel cars the following year. His shop was known as Kraftfahrzeug Trunkenpolz Mattighofen, but the name was unregistered. During the Second World War, his wife took care of the business which was thriving mainly on account of diesel engine repairs.

After the war, demand for repair works fell sharply and Trunkenpolz started thinking about producing his own motorcycles. The prototype of his first motorcycle, the R100, was built in 1951. The components of the motorcycle were produced in house, except for the Rotax engines which were made by Fichtel & Sachs. Serial production of the R100 started in 1953. With just 20 employees, motorcycles were built at a rate of three per day.

KTM 1953–1991 
In 1953, businessman Ernst Kronreif became a major shareholder of the company, which was renamed and registered as Kronreif & Trunkenpolz Mattighofen. In 1954, the R125 Tourist was introduced, followed by the Grand Tourist and the scooter Mirabell in 1955.

The company secured its first racing title in the 1954 Austrian 125cc national championship. In 1956, KTM made its appearance at the International Six Days Trials, where Egon Dornauer won a gold medal on a KTM machine.

In 1957, KTM built its first sports motorcycle, the Trophy 125cc. KTM's first moped, named Mecky, was launched in 1957, followed by Ponny I in 1960 and Ponny II in 1962 and Comet in 1963. The 1960s also saw the beginning of bicycle production in Mattighofen.

Ernst Kronreif died in 1960. Two years later in 1962, Hans Trunkenpolz also died of a heart attack. His son Erich Trunkenpolz took charge of the company's management.

As the company continued to expand, the workforce totalled 400 in 1971, and forty years after it was founded, KTM was offering 42 different models. Additionally, KTM was able to produce motorcycles for the racing industry. During the 1970s and 80s, KTM also started to develop and produce engines and radiators. Radiators sold to European car manufacturers constituted a sizable part of the company's business in the 1980s.

In 1978, US subsidiary KTM North America Inc. was founded in Lorain, Ohio.

In 1980, the company was renamed KTM Motor-Fahrzeugbau KG. One year later, KTM had about 700 employees and a turnover of 750m. Schilling (about 54.5m. euros). International business then amounted to 76% of the company's turnover.

However, scooter and moped turnover sank rapidly, and production had to be halted in 1988. Erich Trunkenpolz died in 1989. Takeover of a 51% interest in the company by the Austrian investment trust GIT Trust Holding controlled by Austrian politician Josef Taus in 1989 was followed by unsuccessful attempts to turn the indebted company around, and in 1991, management of KTM was transferred to a consortium of creditor banks.

KTM after 1991 
In 1991, the company was split into four new entities: KTM Sportmotorcycle GmbH (motorcycles division), KTM Fahrrad GmbH (bicycles division), KTM Kühler GmbH (radiators division) and KTM Werkzeugbau GmbH (tooling division).

Now owned by KTM Motorradholding GmbH, which was formed by Cross Holding (a Cross Industries daughter), and other investors, KTM Sportmotorcycle GmbH started operation in 1992 and later took over the sibling tooling division KTM Werkzeugbau. In the following years, while steadily increasing production and turnover, investing in new production and R&D facilities, introducing new models and successfully sponsoring and taking part in various sports racing events, the company underwent a series of restructurings and stakeholder changes guided by KTM's managing director and Cross Industries owner Stefan Pierer. 
In 1994, KTM started production of the Duke series of road motorcycles,  in 1996, KTM motocross machines were first decked out in KTM's signature orange color, and 1997 saw the introduction of liquid-cooled two-cylinder Supermoto and Adventure motorcycles. In 2007, the company debuted the KTM X-Bow sports car.

In 1995, KTM Motorradholding GmbH acquired Swedish motorcycle maker Husaberg AB and took control of the Dutch company White Power Suspension.

In 2007, Indian motorcycle manufacturer Bajaj Auto bought a 14.5% stake in KTM Power Sports AG. By 2013, Bajaj Auto held a 47.97% interest in the company.

In 2013, KTM acquired the formerly Swedish motorcycle maker Husqvarna Motorcycles from its prior owner BMW Motorrad AG. The same year, KTM re-integrated the brand Husaberg into Husqvarna Motorcycles from which it had spun off in the 1990s when Husqvarna was sold to the Italian company Cagiva.

As the final result of the restructuring process, KTM Motorradholding GmbH had become KTM AG in 2012. In 2015, KTM generated a turnover of over 1 billion Euro and employed 2515 people by the end of that year.  Of the four separate companies left after the 1992 split, three were now again part of the KTM Group: KTM Sportmotorcycle GmbH, KTM Werkzeugbau GmbH and KTM Kühler GmbH (today WP Radiators). KTM Fahrrad GmbH (KTM Bike Industries) remains an independent company and is owned by Chinese investors. KTM-Group today contains the brands KTM, Husqvarna Motorcycles and GasGas Motorcycles.

In 2021 Bajaj Auto sold 46.5% of KTM's shares to Pierer Mobility AG in exchange for 49% shares in the latter company and thus became an indirect stakeholder in KTM.

Corporate structure

Ownership 

KTM AG is presently owned by Pierer Mobility AG, which owns about 98.2% of KTM shares. Pierer Mobility AG is majority owned by Pierer Industrie AG (73.32%).

Subsidiaries 
As of 2020, KTM AG has the following subsidiaries:

 KTM Racing AG (Switzerland, 100%)
 KTM Sportmotorcycle GmbH (100%, distribution of motorcycles and parts)
 KTM Sportcar GmbH (100%, production and distribution of the KTM X-Bow)
 KTM Immobilien GmbH (99%, owner of all property and buildings of the KTM Group)
Husqvarna Motorcycles GmbH (100%, distribution of motorcycles and parts)
GASGAS Motorcycles GmbH (Spain, 60%)
WP Suspension GmbH (100%, production of motorcycle suspension components)
W Verwaltungs AG (100%)

Furthermore, KTM Sportmotorcycle GmbH and Husqvarna Motorcycles GmbH operate 24 and 8 distribution subsidiaries worldwide,  respectively,  most of them in European and Asian countries and in the US.

Joint ventures 
KTM started exporting their GS model to the US in 1968 through an American importer, John Penton under the Penton brand. This joint venture lasted until KTM established KTM America Inc. in Ohio in 1978.

In 2005, KTM-Sportmotocycle began a partnership with ATV manufacturer Polaris Industries with the goal of shared research, and more importantly shared distribution networks. This partnership was a two-year trial arrangement, at the end of which both parties had the option of merging the two companies into one. 
In 2006, KTM announced that the partnership with Polaris had been downgraded, and would instead only supply their 450cc and 510cc RFS engines to Polaris.

In January 2008, Bajaj announced that it would jointly develop two new 125cc and 200cc bikes for Europe and the Far East. The bikes would be badged KTM. In January 2012, Bajaj launched the Duke 200 model in India.

In November 2022 KTM acquired a 25,1 % stake in the iconic italian motorcycle manufacturer MV Agusta.

Motorsports 

KTM entered motorsports competing in motocross racing. KTM won its first championship in 1974 when Guennady Moisseev claimed the 250cc Motocross World Championship. By the end of 2016, KTM had won more than 260 world championship titles, making the company one of the most successful brands in motorsports. KTM has claimed 96 MXGP, MX1 and MX2 world titles since 1974 and 114 E1, E2, E3 and Super Enduro world titles since 1990. With Ryan Dungey's 2015, 2016 and 2017 victories in the supercross world championship, KTM gained a successful presence in supercross racing as well. In 1994, a KTM factory team debuted at the Dakar Rally. In 1998, KTM riders won second to twelfth place. With consecutive wins from 2001 to 2019, the manufacturer has dominated the rally for 18 years now. KTM teams successfully compete in other rally raid events like the Atlas Rally or the Rallye du Maroc. KTM has won 37 cross country rallies world titles since 2003 and has won the FIM Cross-Country Rallies World Championship 15 times, most recently in 2015.

In 2003, KTM started sponsoring and supporting road racing in various capacities, with the most successful results stemming from their supermoto efforts. From 2003 to 2009, a KTM factory team competed in the 125 cc class of the motorcycle Grands Prix, and between 2005 and 2008 in the 250 cc class. Notable successes in the 125 cc class were the second and third place in the overall ranking scored in 2005 by KTM riders Mika Kallio and Gábor Talmácsi, the second place in 2006 by Mika Kallio, the third place in 2007 by Tomoyoshi Koyama and the 2005 KTM victory in the 125 cc constructor's championship. In the 250 cc class, Mika Kallio won third place in 2008. Since the first Rookies Cup season in 2007, KTM has supplied the bike for the Red Bull MotoGP Rookies Cup.

Grand Prix motorcycle racing
In 2009, KTM announced their withdrawal from Grand Prix motorcycle racing in all classes, and did not return until 2012 in the new Moto3 class.

In 2012, KTM won the Moto3 manufacturers' championship. During the next season, KTM riders prevailed in every race of the Moto3 class and won the world title as well as second and third place, making KTM the obvious victor of the manufacturers' standing. KTM won the manufacturer title in the 2014 and 2016 as well as the world title in 2016 in the Moto3 class. Starting in 2017, KTM fields bikes in both MotoGP and Moto2 classes as well. The main class team features Bradley Smith and Pol Espargaró as full-season riders, and Mika Kallio as wildcard rider. The Moto2 KTM Ajo team features Miguel Oliveira and Brad Binder.
Steadfastly independent and confident of their company's abilities, KTM chose to use a steel trellis frame where all other manufacturers used aluminum. In addition, KTM insisted on developing their own racing suspension through their WP subsidiary (all other manufacturers used Öhlins). KTM demonstrated their prowess in doing things their own way by winning their first Moto GP premier class race on August 9, 2020, with rookie Brad Binder crossing the finish line in first place.

From 2009 to 2011, KTM teams competed in the IDM, the Superbike International German Championships. There were speculations about a possible KTM foray into the superbike world championship. Due to the company's focus shifting away from the RC8 and generally superbike design, these plans are off the table for the foreseeable future.

KTM's official company/team colours are orange, black and silver. To create a strong brand identity, all competition-ready KTMs come from the factory with bright orange plastic with "KTM" emblazoned on the side of the radiator shrouds. All KTM bikes also come from the factory with a Motorex sticker on the outside of the motor. All first fills of oil come from Motorex as well. Some official KTM teams use different colors for their bikes, most noticeably in the Dakar Rally.

Products

Off-road motorcycles 
KTM manufactures a wide range of off-road motorcycles. Not all of their models are available in every country. The following section lists bikes that are sold in the US.

Motocross – The current Motocross line designated by SX includes 50, 65, 85,  105, 125, 150 and 250 cc single-cylinder two-stroke models (the 50 SX, 65 SX and 85 SX models are kids' and youth bikes), and 250, 350 and 450 cc single-cylinder four-stroke models (SX-F). In 2005 KTM released the new 250SX-F to the general public. Since 2007, the SX-F's have been KTM's new racing motocross range. Current versions of the KTM SX-F line have a dual overhead camshaft engine dubbed the “RC4”.

Cross-Country – The current cross-country line designated by XC includes 150, 250 and 300 cc two-stroke models and 250, 350 and 450 cc four-stroke models. The two-stroke XC machines except the 150 cc model are available with either wide-ratio or close-ratio transmission (when switching gears, there is a more or less pronounced rpm change). The four-stroke models are fitted with a semi-close ratio gearbox. Most models are equipped with an electric starter.

The very lightweight XC bikes are competition bikes only; they do not meet homologation regulations.

Enduro – The street-legal EXC enduro versions of KTM's XC cross-country bikes are supplied with plusher non-linkage suspensions, a wider-ratio gear box and lights.

The current line available in the US consists of 250, 350, 450 and 500 (actually 510 cc) four-stroke EXC models and the 690 cc Enduro R dual-sport motorcycle.

Free Ride – A KTM original class of off-road motorcycle that could be described as a cross between Enduro and trials bikes. The Freeride 250R is powered by a lighter, modified version of the 250 EXC Enduro engine and has a specially developed six-speed gearbox with close transmission ratios in the lower gears and a wide ratio for the sixth gear. A four-stroke 350 cc free ride model with similar characteristics, and the all-electric single-speed models Freeride E-SX, Freeride E-XC as well as their street version Freeride E-SM are available in Europe.

Two-stroke development 
In the 1990s, AMA rule changes put the cheaper, simpler two-stroke machines at a disadvantage to four-stroke bikes in motocross competitions by limiting two-stroke displacement at 125 cc for the 250 cc class and 250 cc for the 450 cc class. While other manufacturers have decided to discontinue their two-stroke models, KTM has continued with creating and improving their two-stroke engines and has consequently taken up a very high proportion of the two-stroke bike market.

New European emission laws have increased the pressure on two-stroke bikes, as their engines are less fuel efficient and produce more pollution than four-stroke engines. However, with newer advances in technology, two-strokes have begun to burn cleaner and pass stricter environmental standards. Starting in 2017, all newly registered motorcycles must conform with the Euro 4 regulations for emissions management. In May 2017, KTM unveiled a new two-stroke engine with direct fuel injection. By pressure-injecting an electronically controlled amount of fuel into the transfer port of the cylinder, the new TPI (transfer port injection) engines will be more fuel efficient and cleaner than classic carburetor two-stroke engines, albeit more complex and expensive. By 2018, 250 and 300 EXC TPI enduro models will be powered by the new engine.

Street bikes 

The first KTM street bike was the Duke 620 in 1994.
 
Supermoto – KTM was the first manufacturer to offer a competition-ready supermoto bike to the public. However, the company stopped supermoto production in 2016 to focus on stock 690 SMC R machines. For the 2019 Model year, the 690 SMC R model was completely renewed. The bike now has the latest version of the single cylinder LC4 power unit, introduced for the MY2016 Duke. The previous supermoto models included the 625 SMC and the race version 560 SMR. The 141 kg light 690 SMC R model has a 48 kW liquid-cooled one-cylinder four-stroke motor (LC4) and a hydraulically actuated APTC slipper clutch.

Adventure tourers – KTM currently produces the 1090 Adventure, 790 Adventure, and 1290 Super Adventure dual-sport adventure bikes in versions with different seat height, wheels and suspensions that endow the machines with a road (S), off-road (R – for rally) or touring (T) bias. Not all versions are available on the US market.

The 1090 Adventure and 1290 Super Adventure bikes are powered by 75 degree V-twin four-stroke motors (LC8). The 790 Adventure is powered by the new LC8c parallel twin four-stroke motor. All 3 feature a slipper clutch, electronically controlled riding modes (sport, street and rain) with the 1290 and 790 featuring a TFT display and the 1090 featuring a twin (analog plus LCD) display.

Sports tourer – The KTM sports tourer 1290 Superduke GT (Gran Turismo) is a version of the 1290 Superduke R naked bike that has been modified for more touring comfort with a longer and more robust frame, modified handlebar, larger fuel tank and modified 75 degree V-twin four-stroke LC8 motor. Like the 1290 Super Adventure, the 1290 Superduke GT features three electronically controlled riding modes.

Naked bikes – With the Duke and Superduke models, KTM currently offers naked bikes with 125, 200, 250, 390, 690, 790, 890 and 1290 cc displacement. The 125 (not available in the US), 200, 250, 390 and 690 and 690 R Duke models have a single-cylinder four-stroke LC4 motor. The 790, 890 Duke use a new twin-parallel engine.  The 1290 R Superduke model is equipped with a 75 degree V-twin four-stroke motor (LC8).

200, 250 and 390 Duke models are currently produced by Bajaj Auto in Pune, India.The 250 is only available in Asia, with only the Duke 390 and Duke 200 being exported to European countries and North America. The Duke 200 2020 model is now available in the United States and has a new redesigned 200 cc displacement engine.

Supersport – KTM sport bikes currently offered in the supersport category include the RC 125 (not available in the US) and the RC 390. Both are street-legal versions of bikes that compete in street races. With the RC16, KTM has presented a 1000 cc sport bike that will race in the MotoGP class of the 2017 Road Racing World Championship Grand Prix. Whether there will be a street-legal production version of the RC16 at a later point in time is yet unclear.

In Asia, KTM also markets RC 200 and RC 250 street bikes. KTM is also planning to introduced a new 150cc bike in its RC lineup in the Asian countries. This would be the KTC RC 150, that will powered by a 149cc, single-cylinder engine and 6-speed gearbox. This will be launched at a more affordable price, so everyone can opt for it.

Superbike – Currently, KTM has retired from superbike production and competitions. From 2008 to 2015, the company produced the 1190 RC8 superbike, a light, powerful homologated (street-legal) bike for superbike competitions with an LC8 motor and without any of the electronic driving aids that the otherwise comparable Superduke and Super Adventure models offer.

Design 
Since 1992, KTM motorcycles have been designed by KISKA, a Salzburg-based design firm. KISKA also designed four versions of the X-Bow and is responsible for the overall branding for KTM and Husqvarna.

Parts and Wear 
Under the Powerparts label, KTM sells tuning and styling parts for its street and off-road motorcycles and the X-Bow. The Powerwear label offers race gear and equipment, clothing, accessories and merchandise articles.

X-Bow 

The KTM X-Bow (pronounced cross-bow) is a series of lightweight, two-seater sports cars known as the X-Bow R, the X-Bow RR, the X-Bow GT and the X-BOW GT4. The R and GT versions of the X-Bow are street-legal in Europe, North America, China and Australia. It uses an Audi engine and a carbon fibre chassis developed in cooperation with Italian racing car manufacturer Dallara, making it the world's first street-legal car with a full carbon fibre monocoque.

References

External links 

KTM International website
KTM Bicycles website

Austrian brands
Austrian companies established in 1934
Bajaj Group
British GT Championship teams
Car brands
Car manufacturers of Austria
Cycle manufacturers of Austria
Economy of Upper Austria
Motorcycle manufacturers of Austria
Motorcycles by brand
Mountain bike manufacturers
Multinational companies headquartered in Austria
Sports car manufacturers
Vehicle manufacturing companies established in 1934